María Cristina Cifuentes Cuencas (born 1 July 1964) is a former Spanish politician from the People's Party. She was the President of the Community of Madrid from 24 June 2015 to her 25 April 2018 resignation. From 16 January 2012 to 13 April 2015, she served as the Government Delegate in the Community of Madrid.

Biography
In 1980, when Cifuentes was 16, she became a member of People's Alliance, which would later become the People's Party of Spain. She studied law at the Complutense University of Madrid.

In 2013, she suffered a traffic accident in Madrid while she was riding her motorbike, which put her in a coma for nearly a month.

After being the Government Delegate in Madrid from 2012 to 2015, Cifuentes was elected President of the Autonomous Community of Madrid with the support of the centre-right Spanish party Citizens, having won the 2015 regional election and having obtained 48 representatives out of 129 in the Assembly of Madrid.

On 21 March 2018, Cifuentes was alleged to have fraudulently obtained her Master's degree from King Juan Carlos University. On 5 April 2018, a judicial investigation of the case was opened.

On 25 April 2018, she resigned as President of the Community of Madrid, after the release of a 2011 video that showed her being detained in a supermarket for shoplifting (goods worth €40), with Ángel Garrido succeeding her as acting president of the community. On 27 April 2018, she resigned from the presidency of the People's Party of the Community of Madrid. On 8 May 2018, Cifuentes resigned from her seat in the Assembly of Madrid and announced her retirement from politics.

On 2 September 2019 the Audiencia Nacional charged Cifuentes together with fellow former regional premiers Ignacio González and Esperanza Aguirre with alleged crimes of illicit funding, diversion of public money and document forgery in the proceedings of the Púnica corruption case.

As of October 2019, she appeared in the television program Ya es mediodía as a panelist, and in February 2020, she was signed on Todo es mentira.

Electoral history

References

1964 births
Presidents of the Community of Madrid
People's Party (Spain) politicians
Complutense University of Madrid alumni
Living people
Members of the 10th Assembly of Madrid
Members of the 4th Assembly of Madrid
Members of the 9th Assembly of Madrid
Members of the 8th Assembly of Madrid
Members of the 3rd Assembly of Madrid
Members of the 5th Assembly of Madrid
Members of the 6th Assembly of Madrid
Members of the 7th Assembly of Madrid
First Secretaries of the Assembly of Madrid
First Vice Presidents of the Assembly of Madrid
Members of the People's Parliamentary Group (Assembly of Madrid)
21st-century Spanish women politicians
Women presidents of the autonomous communities of Spain